Walter Tennyson Swingle (January 8, 1871 – January 19, 1952) was an American agricultural botanist who contributed greatly to the classification and taxonomy of citrus.

Biography
Swingle was born in Canaan, Pennsylvania, and moved with his family to Kansas two years later. 

He graduated from the Kansas State Agricultural College in 1890, and studied at the University of Bonn in 1895–96 and 1898.

Swingle married Lucie Romstaedt in 1901; she died in 1910. He married Maude Kellerman, daughter of William Ashbrook Kellerman, in 1915 and they had four children. He died in Washington, D.C., on January 19, 1952.

In 1927, botanist Elmer Drew Merrill published Swinglea, which is a genus of flowering plants from the Philippines, belonging to the family Rutaceae and named in Walter Tennyson Swingle's honor.

Contribution to US agricultural industry
Swingle worked at the United States Department of Agriculture (1891), investigated subtropic fruits, established laboratories in Florida, became an agricultural explorer, and (after 1902) had charge of crop physiology and breeding investigations. He developed the tangelo citrus hybrid in 1897 in Eustis, Florida.

He made several visits to the Mediterranean countries of Europe, to North Africa, and to Asia Minor, from where he introduced the date palm, pistachio nut and other useful plants, as well as the fig wasp, to make possible the cultivation of Smyrna figs in California. 

Swingle also traveled to Asia, bringing back 100,000 Chinese volumes on botany to the Library of Congress. 

Much of his research is published in the five-volume book, The Citrus Industry, of which he wrote a significant portion.

Plant anatomy collection
An extensive collection related to Swingle and his life, photos and works entitled the "Swingle Plant Anatomy Reference Collection" is hosted at the University of Miami.

Selected publications

References

External links 
 
Walter Tennyson Swingle Collection  University of Miami Libraries Special Collections Finding Aid. The collection contain papers, articles, correspondence and other materials that provide information on his botanical and plant introduction work as well as his personal life and travels.
Swingle Plant Anatomy Reference Collection  The site features over 1,700 photomicrographs of plant parts from more than 250 species of plants collected from all over the world, plant structure animations, and information on Walter Tennyson Swingle.
Walter Tennyson Swingle: botanist and exponent of Chinese civilization

People from Wayne County, Pennsylvania
American botanists
1871 births
1952 deaths